Juma Mohammed Al Kaabi (1966  – February 15, 2017) was an Emirati career diplomat who served as the United Arab Emirates Ambassador to Afghanistan from July 28, 2016 to January 10, 2017. Al Kaabi died after suffering from injuries that were sustained on the 10 January 2017 Afghanistan bombings while he was on a humanitarian mission to open an orphanage in Kandahar, Afghanistan.

Early life and education 

Al Kaabi was born in 1966 in the village of Wadi Al Qor in Ras Al Khaimah, United Arab Emirates. He was the eldest of his siblings. He has 2 brothers and 6 sisters. His father died while he was 18 years old and he became the primary care taker of his family after the death of his father.

Career 
After finishing high school, he joined the United Arab Emirates Armed Forces. He then joined the UAE Ministry of Foreign Affairs for 8 years before being appointed on July 28, 2016 as the UAE Ambassador to Afghanistan.

Death 

On January 10, 2017 Al Kaabi was on a humanitarian mission to Kandahar province, Afghanistan, to lay the foundation stone of an orphanage sponsored by the UAE government. A bombing occurred while he was on a dinner visit to the Kandahar governor's house, Humayun Azizi. A member of the Kandahar governor’s staff – likely a cook – smuggled explosives hidden in food to the compound. Authorities said the bomb was planted in a sofa and exploded when Ambassador Juma Al Kaabi and Kandahar Governor Humayun Azizi had stepped out of the room. A total of 13 people were killed and 18 were injured in the explosion among them Al Kaabi and Azizi. 5 UAE diplomats were killed in the attack. The attack was one of three other attacks that occurred on the same date. Taliban claimed responsibility for the other two attacks, but denied the responsibility of the attack on the UAE diplomatic mission.

Al Kaabi was evacuated to Abu Dhabi by a military plane to receive further treatment for his injuries. He was then transferred for medical treatment in one of the specialty hospitals in France. On February 15, 2017, the Ministry of Presidential Affairs announced that Al Kaabi has died due to his injuries which were sustained on the bombing attack.

According to Emirati security officials, the bomb device was a sophisticated device used in an assassination attempt and had three compartments, which exploded one after the other ensuring that even late-arriving rescuers were hit by the blasts.

Personal life 
Al Kaabi was married and had 3 daughters, 2 sons, and 2 grandchildren.

See also 
Afghanistan–United Arab Emirates relations

References

1966 births
2017 deaths
Ambassadors of the United Arab Emirates to Afghanistan